Poecilasthena subpurpureata is a species of moth of the family Geometridae. It was first described by Francis Walker in 1863 and it is endemic to New Zealand. A synomic species, Astheniodes polycymaria (the two species have almost identical male genitalia), has a holotype that was recorded by George Hampson as being from India, which, as Dayong Xue and Malcolm J. Scoble point out in their paper, would be a very strange distribution pattern. Louis Beethoven Prout reasonably calls this an error in his 1926 paper.

References

Moths described in 1863
Poecilasthena
Moths of New Zealand
Endemic fauna of New Zealand
Taxa named by Francis Walker (entomologist)
Endemic moths of New Zealand